Technological Revolutions and Financial Capital: The Dynamics of Bubbles and Golden Ages is an academic book by Carlota Perez that seeks to describe the connection between technological development and financial bubbles as seen in  the emergence of long term technology trends.  The model described by Carlota Perez shows repeated surges of technological development over the past three centuries with examples such as: the age of steam and railways, the age of steel and electricity, mass production and the automobile and the current information/knowledge society.

Five technological revolutions
The book identifies five bursts of technological innovation that have occurred in industrial history.

Financial cycles 
Carlota Perez has found that these cycles of technological revolutions are coupled with financial cycles. Each cycle, which may take 50 – 60 years, consists of the following four phases:

Irruption phase: There is an intense funding of innovation in new technologies. Clusters of new revolutionary inventions appear. New industries are established, and the construction of new infrastructure begins.

 Frenzy phase: Increased speculation and financialization leads to a decoupling between financial capital and production capital. Capital is invested more in financial innovations than in technological innovations. Asset bubbles are inflated.

Synergy phase: Growing inequality and political unrest. A need for political regulation of the financial sector is acknowledged. Asset bubbles may burst. The link between financial capital and production capital is repaired.

Maturity phase: The market for the new technology begins to become saturated. Social structure and infrastructure have adapted to the new technologies. Opportunities for investment are decreasing. The idle financial capital is moving to new sectors and new regions where it may lay the foundation of the next great surge.

Critical reviews
A Foreign Affairs review said "A broad-sweep 'think piece' in the Schumpeterian spirit, this book discusses the relationship between major technological innovations and financial booms and busts."

An Economist article summarizes her work, "In her book, “Technological Revolutions and Financial Capital”, Ms Perez traces five boom-and-bust cycles of technological innovation: the industrial revolution; steam and railways; steel, electricity and heavy engineering; oil, cars and mass production; and information technology and telecommunications.

References 

Books about economic growth